Blackburn Rugby Club is an English rugby union club based in Blackburn, Lancashire. The first XV  currently play in the level 5 league, North Premier, having reached the national levels of the sport for the first time in 2019. They were promoted after winning the 2018–19 North 1 East/North 1 West promotion play-off.

Honours
 North West 1 champions: 1996–97
 North Lancashire/Cumbria champions (2): 2007–08, 2014–15
 North 1 East/North 1 West promotion play-off winners: 2018–19

References

External links
 Club website

English rugby union teams
Rugby union in Lancashire
Sports clubs in England
Blackburn